John M. McKeon (October 29, 1882 - March 18, 1939) was an American politician from St. Louis, Missouri, who served in the Missouri Senate.

References

1882 births
1939 deaths
Democratic Party Missouri state senators
20th-century American politicians